Raciel Gonzalez Isidoria (born 31 March 1991) is a Paralympian athlete from Cuba competing mainly in T46 classification sprint events.

Athletics career
Gonzalez Isidoria first represented Cuba at a major international competition in 2011 when he travelled to Guadalajara to compete in the Parapan American Games. He competed in the 100 metre sprint, winning a silver medal. The next year Gonzalez Isidoria represented his country at the 2012 Summer Paralympics in London, where he competed at two events, the 100 and 200 metre sprints. He managed to make the finals of both races, finishing in silver medal position in both. As well as the Paralympics, Gonzalez Isidoria has represented his country at two World Championships, at Lyon in 2013 and Doha in 2015. In Lyon he won a bronze medal in the 200 metres sprint. He failed to medal at Doha, but as his classification was not represented in the sprints he was forced to compete at the T47 events, for athlete with a less severe impairment than his own.

Personal history
Gonzalez Isidoria was born in Cuba in 1985.

Notes

Living people
1991 births
Athletes from Havana
Paralympic athletes of Cuba
Paralympic sprinters
Sprinters with limb difference
Cuban male sprinters
Athletes (track and field) at the 2012 Summer Paralympics
Paralympic silver medalists for Cuba
Medalists at the 2012 Summer Paralympics
Paralympic medalists in athletics (track and field)
Medalists at the 2011 Parapan American Games
21st-century Cuban people